WTII Records is an independent record label created in 2001 by former Wax Trax! Records employee Bart Pfanenstiel, and David Schock.

History

WTII established 
The concept behind WTII started in 1999 while Bart Pfanenstiel was employed at Wax Trax!, During Wax Trax!'s final year, Pfanenstiel and Dannie Flesher (co-founder of Wax Trax!) were working to move Wax Trax into the modern era of electro/industrial music, tapping into the new breed of bands making their way to the US from Europe. Pfanenstiel had made a connection with Stefan Herwig, of then Offbeat Records. The two had discussed licensing possibilities and the first of those opportunities came with the signing of VNV Nation to Wax Trax!. At that time TVT (Wax Trax! parent label) had decided to move in a different direction, shutting down the Wax Trax! offices in Chicago, Pfanenstiel created a new label to capitalize on these opportunities. Jim Nash (co-founder of Wax Trax!) and Dannie Flesher had taught Pfanenstiel how to manage a label. After Jim Nash's death, Bart worked with Flesher on all label activities.  Bart Pfanenstiel wanted to create a label that would rekindle the spirit of Wax Trax!'s early years.

With a roster of available artists,  Pfanenstiel sought out the help of David Schock, who had experience working at a small independent music distributor. Schock had built strong relationships with mom-n-pop, brick and mortar and chain stores nationwide. .
WTII Records, LLC was officially launched on January 1, 2001.

2001–2006 
The labels initial plan was to build a solid roster and catalog by licensing established artists from Europe. The first three artists licensed by WTII were In Strict Confidence, Melotron and Controlled Fusion. WTII 001, In Strict Confidence's Love Kills! was officially released on March 14, 2001 and the label spared no expense on their initial release. The booklet for Love Kills! was a limited run 20 page velum booklet that had to be specially printed.
Over the first five years, the label continued to grow and build a solid catalog and fan base. The label stuck to its initial plan and added well-established artists, including: Stromkern, Beborn Beton, HMB, Arcanta, cut.rate.box, La Floa Maldita, Backlash, Acumen Nation and Regenerator. With a core roster in place, the labels expansion changed focus and the emphasis went from signing established artists to developing new talent. The label signed and released debut albums from newcomers like State of the Union, Trigger 10d, Monstrum Sepsis, and PTI.

2002 saw the label first two major tours as Beborn Beton crossed the country as the opening act for Apoptygma Berzerk. The tour coincided with the release of Beborn Beton's greatest hits album, Tales From Another World. Stromkern initially toured the country in support of their Armageddon release and then followed that up with a second tour in support of the Re-align EP.

In 2003 the label held its first festival, WTII Minifest, a two-day celebration of the labels first two years. The event was held at the Underground Lounge on Friday and the Bottom Lounge on Saturday and featured performances from Monstrum Sepsis, Trigger 10d, cut.rate.box, State of the Union and HMB.
2004 saw the release of Stromkern's back catalog, Flicker Like a Candle and Dammerung Im Traum, Trigger 10d remix album But the Girl's the Same, State of the Union's sophomore album Inpendum and the debut of PTI.

2005 was the year of Stromkern as the band released their DAC #1 single Stand Up followed by the critically acclaimed album Light it Up. The band completed several festival dates and a full North American Tour with label mates PTI. To complete the year they released a second single from the album, Reminders, and kicked off 2006 with a second tour of the US and Europe with industrial legends Front Line Assembly.

In 2006, the label celebrated its 5th Anniversary with a promotional compilation entitled "The 5 Year Hits" also known as the "WTII 5th Anniversary Compilation." The album was a mix CD that featured the labels club hits and contained a track from every artist on the WTII roster. The CD was mixed by well-known Chicago DJs Jeff Moyer and DJ Pulz-8 and mastered by Chris Randall of Sister Machine Gun. The CDs were handed out at shows, clubs and conventions across the country and can still be downloaded for free on the WTII website.

Over the first 5 years WTII had experienced success in licensing tracks and musical snippets to several high-profile TV stations, independent films and video games. State of the Union, Stromkern, Trigger 10d and Monstrum Sepsis all had tracks appear in episodes of MTV's Made, MTV's My Super Sweet 16, MTV's Trailer Fabulous. Monstrum Sepsis' music appeared on A&E's Biography and Vh1's Driven and Stromkern's Stand Up appeared in a SpikeTV's webisode called Death Guild and was featured in the hit video game, Project Gotham Racing 3. Monstrum Sepsis' Mace appeared in The Matrix:Reload and Monstrum Sepsis scored the soundtrack to the online Matrix:Reloaded video game. Trigger 10d and HMB appeared in the independent film Shut-eye with HMB's Impulse receiving the honor of the title track.

2007–2010 
The labels sound and roster continued to diversify and the emphasis remained on developing new artists. In 2007 the label ventured into the electronic rock scene with the signing of New York-based The Qualia and released the third and final single from Stromkern's Light it Up album.
2008 saw much more activity from the label as they released albums from State of the Union, Monstrum Sepsis and signed electro/alternative act The Thought Criminals. The end of the year also saw the signing of powerhouse newcomer The Gothsicles. Their video game infused form of chaos started 2009 with a bang and that energy carried over throughout the year as the label signed and released a greatest hits collection from industrial pioneers, Dessau, a single from The Thought Criminals and signed gothic legends Attrition.

In 2010 the label added another new artist in coldwave rockers, Am.Psych and released sophomore albums from The Qualia and Trigger10d.
At the end of 2010, WTII's persistence and success caught the attention from members of Nail Distribution. The label began negotiating a deal that would provide full distribution coverage across North America and in December 2010 an agreement was reached between the two. This international agreement was a major step forward for the label. After years of self-distribution, the label was now able to focus more on artist promotion and development.

2011–2016 
2011 started a new era for the label as they approached the year with a new distribution network and a catalog worth of upcoming releases. The label signed UK up and comer Method Cell and their album, Curse of a Modern Age was the first album released using the new distribution network. Later that year the label signed and released albums from Canadian hardcore industrial artist Stiff Valentine, the legendary Claus Larsen's (aka Leaether Strip) alter ego Klutae, Sweden's synthpop/electronic rock band Lowe, and Pittsburgh's industrial act Rein[Forced]. In addition to the new acts, the label had releases from The Gothsicles and The Qualia.
In the summer of 2011, WTII celebrated its 10th Anniversary with Minifest 2, a 4-day festival which featured performances from WTII artists Trigger 10d, Am.Psych, Rein[Forced], The Gothsicles, Stiff Valentine, Dead on TV, Stromkern and other local and national acts. Throughout the year there were also performances across the globe from The Gothsicles, The Qualia, Stiff Valentine, Rein[Forced], Method Cell, Klutae and Attrition. The busy year was capped off by an East coast tour from Lowe. The highlight of their tour was a CMJ (College Music Journal) showcase in New York City.

To kick off 2012, Stromkern made their long-awaited return with the release of a new EP. The label expansion and diversity continued as they added a mix of new and established artists. Coming off their impressive performance at the Minifest 2, electro-punks Dead on TV made their WTII debut in the spring with the release of the Fuck You, I'm Famous EP. Analog noise manipulators Prometheus Burning made their label debut in the fall with the release of Kill it With Fire. The label compiled its first free mp3 compilations that included tracks from everyone on the label and was available for download on the label's website, Amazon.com, iTunes and several other sites. To round out the year the label released a remix album from Stiff Valentine and a new album from Rein[Forced].
Over the years the UK has continued to churn out some of the brightest artists in the scene. WTII discovered this talented pool a few years earlier when they signed up and comers Method Cell and The Thought Criminals. In 2013, WTII had the privilege to sign two of London's favorites in Mechanical Cabaret and Deviant UK. Both artists' came armed with multiple releases which started the year with a bang. Mechanical Cabaret released a "Best of" called Selective Hearing in March and a new album in October and Deviant UK released North American versions of two of their classic albums. The label added another legendary act in SMP (Sounds of Mass Production) and released their album called Death of the Format. Two new acts, Blume and Die Sektor, released albums in the fall and both bands have quickly become two of the hottest acts on the scene. Both Blume's Autumn Ruins and Die Sektor's (-)existence have quickly climbed to the top 10 in album charts across the globe and led to several festival and one-off dates around the world.

In the fall of 2013 the label made another significant step forward when it entered into an overseas distribution agreement with Planetworks Entertainment. Now with Nail handling the labels North American network and Planetworks taking care of the overseas markets, the label now has complete coverage across the globe.

2014 was another stellar year as the label saw new releases from State of the Union and Mechanical Cabaret and welcomed coldwave legends Slave Unit and well established UK stalwarts Autoclav1.1 and AlterRed and newcomers Stars Crusaders. 
 
The label entered 2015 with probably the strongest release schedule to date.  Mechanical Cabaret and The Gothsicles kicked off the year with a new single and EP, respectively. That was followed by the long-awaited digital release of Stromkern's limited edition version of Armageddon.  Things went into high gear in March as the label released the first new material from Sister Machine Gun in 7 years and Regenerator rejoined the label releasing their first new album in 6 years.  Industrial super group Deathproof made their debut and Autoclav1.1, Stars Crusaders both had new material.  The label re-issued a remastered version of Mechanical Cabaret's debut album which included unreleased tracks and bonus remixes. As the label headed into the fall, the label welcomed tribal/noise powerhouse ESA to the fold and released the third album of their Themes of Carnal Empowerment trilogy to rave reviews.  The label also entered into a new partnership with Austin Texas' CHANT and saw them hit the road with industrial legends KMFDM.  CHANT raised the bar with a drum infused, high energy live set that garnered praise and new fans across North America.  Die Sektor hit the road for most of the fall and crossed the continent twice on two separate tours.  Chicago's Comasoft closed out the physical release schedule with the Let's Go All the Way EP which included 3 versions of the Sly Fox classic.  ESA and Stars Crusaders finished 2015 with two new digital EPs.

2016 marks the 15th Anniversary of the label and looks to be another promising year.  The first release for 2016 will be the debut from Canadian EBM powerhouse nTTx.

Overview
Over the years the label roster has continued to grow with artists that vary in sound and style. With releases from artists like Stromkern, Autoclav1.1, Prometheus Burning, SMP, Slave Unit, Sister Machine Gun, Deathproof, Beborn Beton, Deviant UK, AlterRed, ESA (Electronic Substance Abuse), Mechanical Cabaret, Blume, State of the Union, Trigger 10d, The Thought Criminals, The Gothsicles, Dessau, Die Sektor, Frontal Boundary, Attrition, In Strict Confidence, Monstrum Sepsis, Klutae, Trigger 10d, Stiff Valentine, Method Cell, Lowe, Stars Crusaders, The Qualia, cut.rate.box, Dead on TV, Rein Forced, PTI, Backlash, am.psych, and HMB, WTII has been pushing the electronic spectrum to new limits.

Distribution
The label is currently distributed worldwide by MVD (Music and Video Distribution) former distributors include NAIL Distribution a Division of the Allegro Media Group and Planetworks Entertainment.

Artist roster

See also
 List of record labels

References

External links
 Official site

American record labels
Record labels established in 2001
Industrial record labels
Companies based in Louisville, Kentucky
2001 establishments in Illinois
American companies established in 2001